John Gore Jones (1820–1868) was a politician in Queensland, Australia. He was a Member of the Queensland Legislative Assembly.

Politics
On 14 January 1862, St. George Richard Gore, member for Warwick, resigned to contest a ministerial by-election after being made Secretary of Public Lands and Works. However, he was defeated by  
John Gore Jones who was elected at the resulting by-election on 4 February 1862. Jones held Warwick until 10 June 1863 (the 1863 election).

He contested the seats of Brisbane and West Moreton in the 1863 election but was unsuccessful.

Under the Additional Members Act 1864, six new electorates were created: Clermont, Kennedy, Maryborough, Mitchell, Rockhampton and Warrego. By-elections to fill the new seats were held on 1 February 1865 (Maryborough and Rockhampton), on 18 March 1865 (Clermont and Kennedy) and on 25 March 1865 (Mitchell and Warrego). Jones was elected in Mitchell on 18 March 1865 which he held until he resigned on 1 January 1866. Theodore Harden won the resulting by-election on 22 February 1866.

See also
 Members of the Queensland Legislative Assembly, 1860–1863; 1863-1867

References

External links
  — Obituary

Members of the Queensland Legislative Assembly
1820 births
1868 deaths
19th-century Australian politicians